Marty Heaton (born December 11, 1959) is a former American football coach.  He served as the head football coach at Adams State University from 2008 to 2014, comping a record of 42–35.

Head coaching record

References

1959 births
Living people
Adams State Grizzlies football coaches